Tally Mountain may refer to:
 Tally Mountain (Georgia), two different mountain peaks in Georgia
 Tally Mountain (Montana), a mountain in Flathead County, Montana